Pueblo is a home rule municipality that is the county seat and the most populous municipality of Pueblo County, Colorado, United States. The city population was 111,876 at the 2020 United States Census, making Pueblo the ninth most populous city in Colorado. Pueblo is the principal city of the Pueblo, CO Metropolitan Statistical Area and a major city of the Front Range Urban Corridor.

With its location in the "Banana Belt", Pueblo tends to get less snow than the other major cities in Colorado.

Pueblo is one of the largest steel-producing cities in the United States, for which reason Pueblo is referred to as the "Steel City". The Historic Arkansas River Project (HARP) is a riverwalk in the Union Avenue Historic Commercial District, and shows the history of the devastating Pueblo Flood of 1921.

Pueblo has the least expensive residential real estate of all major cities in Colorado. The median home price for homes on the market in Pueblo is $192,500 as of April 2018. It is the sixth most affordable place to live in the United States as measured by the 2014 Cost of Living Index. Costs of housing, goods and services, utilities, transportation, groceries and health care are lower than the national average. Pueblo was listed by AARP in 2013 as one of the best affordable places to live.

History

El Pueblo

James Beckwourth, George Simpson, and other trappers such as Mathew Kinkead and John Brown, claimed to have helped construct the plaza that became known as El Pueblo around 1842. According to accounts of residents who traded at the plaza (including that of George Simpson), the Fort Pueblo Massacre happened sometime between December 23 and December 25, 1854, by a war party of Utes and Jicarilla Apaches under the leadership of Tierra Blanca, a Ute chief. They allegedly killed between fifteen and nineteen men, as well as captured two children and one woman. The trading post was abandoned after the raid, but it became important again between 1858 and 1859 during the Colorado Gold Rush of 1859.

Early development: railroads, steel, expansion, and orphanages 
The current city of Pueblo represents the consolidation of four towns: Pueblo (incorporated 1870), South Pueblo (incorporated 1873), Central Pueblo (incorporated 1882), and Bessemer (incorporated 1886). Pueblo, South Pueblo, and Central Pueblo legally consolidated as the City of Pueblo between March 9 and April 6, 1886. Bessemer joined Pueblo in 1894.

The consolidated city became a major economic and social center of Colorado, and was home to important early Colorado families such as the Thatchers, the Ormans, and the Adams. By the early 1870s the city was being hailed as a beacon of development, with newspapers like the Chicago Tribune boasting of how the region's lawless reputation was giving way to orderly agriculture with triumphalist rhetoric. One author crowed of Pueblo that "the necessity exists no longer for Sharp's rifles and revolvers. These have been supplied by the plow and the mowing-machine."

Pueblo's development stretched beyond agriculture. Steel emerged as a key industry very early, and in 1909 the city was considered the only steel town west of the Mississippi River.

Until a series of major floods culminated in the Great Flood of 1921, Pueblo was considered the 'Saddle-Making capital of the World'. Roughly one-third of Pueblo's downtown businesses were lost in this flood, along with a substantial number of buildings. Pueblo struggled with this significant loss, but has had a resurgence in growth.

Historically, many people were influenced by the orphanages of Pueblo, and the homes are now all historical sites. The three orphanages in Pueblo were known as Sacred Heart, Lincoln, and McClelland. Lincoln was the first historically black orphanage in Colorado, and one of only seven in the country. Sacred Heart was run by the Catholic Welfare Bureau, while McClelland was run by the Lutheran Church. Several children from Cuba were placed at Sacred Heart as part of "Operation Pedro Pan". Though the orphanages in Pueblo are no longer in service, the buildings still exist and have transformed with the times. According to the Rocky Mountain News, in 1988 the Sacred Heart Orphanage was bought by the Pueblo Housing Authority and turned into 40 small-family housing units.

Steel mill

The main industry in Pueblo for most of its history was the Colorado Fuel and Iron (CF&I) Steel Mill on the south side of town. For nearly a century the CF&I was the largest employer in the state of Colorado. The steel-market crash of 1982 led to the decline of the company. After several bankruptcies, the company was acquired by Oregon Steel Mills and changed its name to Rocky Mountain Steel Mills. The buyout, as well as the end of the union contract in 1997 led to a union strike over pension liabilities, as well as working conditions, wherein the union argued the new owners still needed to pay the pension liabilities provided by the previous owners. With the conclusion of the strike on December 30th, 1997, CF&I had replaced several hundred union workers with local employees. 

In September 2004, both United Steelworkers locals 2102 and 3267 won the strike and the unfair labor practice charges. All of the striking steel workers returned to their jobs, and the company paid them the back pay owed for the seven years they were on strike. In 2007, shortly after Oregon Steel made amends with the union and its workers, Evraz Group, one of Russia's biggest steel producers, agreed to buy the company for $2.3 billion.

Of the many production and fabrication mills that once existed on the site, only the steel production (electric furnaces, used for scrap recycling), rail, rod, bar, and seamless tube mills are still in operation. The wire mill was sold in the late 1990s to Davis Wire, which still produces products such as fence and nails under the CF&I brand name. The facility operated blast furnaces until 1982, when the steel market collapsed. The main blast furnace structures were torn down in 1989, but due to asbestos content, many of the adjacent stoves still remain. The stoves and foundations for some of the furnaces can be seen from Interstate 25, which runs parallel to the plant's west boundary.

Several of the administration buildings, including the main office building, dispensary, and tunnel gatehouse were purchased in 2003 by the Bessemer Historical Society. In 2006, they underwent renovation. In addition to housing the historic CF&I Archives, they also house the Steelworks Museum of Industry and Culture.

"Melting Pot of the West"
Due to the growth of the CF&I steel mill and the employment that it offered, Pueblo in the early twentieth century attracted a large number of immigrant laborers. The groups represented led to Pueblo becoming the most ethnically and culturally diverse city in Colorado and the West. At one point, more than 40 languages were spoken in the steel mill and more than two-dozen foreign language newspapers were published in the city. Irish, Italian, German, Slovenian, Greek, Jewish, Lithuanian, Russian, Hungarian, Japanese, and African-American groups arrived in the area at the turn of the century and remain to the present time. The convergence of cultures led to a cosmopolitan character to the city that resulted in a number of ethnically-rooted neighborhoods that are typically not seen west of the Mississippi. Respective cultural groups maintain cultural festivals to the present, with the city being home to locations of the Order Sons of Italy, American Slovenian Catholic Union, and I.O.O.F., among others.

Colorado Mental Health Institute at Pueblo
Another major employer in Pueblo is Colorado State Hospital. The hospital is the preeminent mental health facility in the Rocky Mountain region. Established in 1879 as the Colorado State Insane Asylum, it was renamed as the Colorado State Hospital in 1917. In 1991, the name was changed to the Colorado Mental Health Institute at Pueblo (CMHIP). The Robert L. Hawkins High Security Forensic Institute opened in June 2009 and is a 200-bed, high-security facility.

Home of Heroes
Pueblo is the hometown of four Medal of Honor recipients (tied only with Holland, Michigan, also with four, each having more than any other municipality in the United States): William J. Crawford, Carl L. Sitter, Raymond G. Murphy, and Drew D. Dix. President Dwight D. Eisenhower, upon presenting Raymond G. "Jerry" Murphy with his medal in 1953, commented, "What is it... something in the water out there in Pueblo? All you guys turn out to be heroes!"

In 1993, Pueblo City Council adopted the tagline "Home of Heroes" for the city due to the fact that Pueblo can claim more recipients of the Medal per capita than any other city in the United States. On July 1, 1993, the Congressional Record recognized Pueblo as the "Home of Heroes." A memorial to the recipients of the medal is at the Pueblo Convention Center. Central High School is known as the "School of Heroes," as it is the alma mater of two recipients, Sitter and Crawford.

Geography
Pueblo sits on the western edge of the Great Plains in a high desert area of terrain in southern Colorado and is near the western edge of the Southwestern Tablelands ecology region. 

Climate
Pueblo has a steppe climate (Köppen BSk), with four distinct seasons. Snowfall usually falls in light amounts, and due to the high altitude, and the accompanying stronger sun, rarely remains on the ground for long (typically, for one or two days). Diurnal temperature ranges are large throughout the year, averaging .

Precipitation is generally low, with the winter months receiving very little. Sunshine is abundant throughout the year, with an annual total of nearly 3,470 hours, or 78% of the possible total. Pueblo is considered a high desert climate, and sits on the desert lands in southern Colorado between Pueblo and the Royal Gorge.

Climate

According to the Köppen Climate Classification system, Pueblo has a cold semi-arid climate, abbreviated "BSk" on climate maps.

Demographics

As of the census of 2000, there were 102,121 people, 40,307 households, and 26,118 families residing in the city. The racial makeup of the city was 56.21% White, 2.41% African American, 1.73% Native American, 0.67% Asian, 0.06% Pacific Islander, 15.20% from other races, and 3.71% from two or more races. Latinos made up 44.13% of the population. 10.1% were of German, 8.1% Italian, 6.0% American, 5.5% English and 5.4% Irish ancestry according to Census 2000.

According to the 2005 Census estimates, the city had grown to an estimated population of 104,951 and had become the ninth most populous city in the state of Colorado and the 245th most populous city in the United States.

There were 40,307 households, out of which 29.8% had children under the age of 18 living with them, 44.5% were married couples living together, 15.1% had a female householder with no husband present, and 35.2% were non-families. 30.0% of all households were made up of individuals, and 12.9% had someone living alone who was 65 years of age or older. The average household size was 2.44 and the average family size was 3.03.

In the city, the ages of the population were spread out, with 25.1% under the age of 18, 10.3% from 18 to 24, 26.6% from 25 to 44, 21.4% from 45 to 64, and 16.6% who were 65 years of age or older. The median age was 36 years. For every 100 females, there were 93.9 males. For every 100 females age 18 and over, there were 90.2 males.

The median income for a household in the city was $29,650, and the median income for a family was $35,620. Males had a median income of $29,702 versus $22,197 for females. The per capita income for the city was $16,026. About 13.9% of families and 17.8% of the population were below the poverty line, including 24.3% of those under age 18 and 9.1% of those age 65 or over.

As of the 2010 census, the population of Pueblo was 106,544 (259th most populous U.S. city), the population of the Pueblo Metropolitan Statistical Area was 159,063 (190th most populous MSA), the population of the Pueblo–Cañon City, CO Combined Statistical Area was 205,887, the population of the South Central Colorado Urban Area was 851,500, and the population of the Front Range Urban Corridor in Colorado was an estimated 4,166,855.

As of the April 2010 census the racial makeup of the city was: 75.2% White, 2.5% Black or African American, 2.2% American Indian and Alaska Native, 0.8% Asian, 0.1% Native Hawaiian and Other Pacific Islander, 4.1% Two or More Races. Hispanic or Latino (of any race) were 49.8% and Non-Hispanic Whites were 45.2% of the population.

Economy
Pueblo is the home of the Federal Citizen Information Center, operated by the General Services Administration, and its Consumer Information Catalog. For over 30 years, public service announcements invited Americans to write for information at "Pueblo, Colorado, 81009". In recent times GSA has incorporated Pueblo into FCIC's toll-free telephone number.

Vestas Wind Systems has constructed the largest (nearly 700,000 square feet) wind turbine tower manufacturing plant in the world at Pueblo's industrial park.

Renewable Energy Systems Americas broke ground on the Comanche Solar Project seven miles south of Pueblo in 2015. When complete, it will be the largest solar energy farm east of the Rocky Mountains, and its backers say the project will produce electricity more cheaply than natural gas. The project will cover 1,000 acres with 500,000 solar panels, providing a capacity of 156 megawatts of power—enough to supply 31,000 homes. The project will be run by SunEdison, with a power purchase agreement signed by Xcel Energy. A number of scientific studies now list Pueblo as the state's primary locale for solar energy development and the premier setting for solar companies to locate, placing it ahead of regional rivals such as Boulder, Colorado and Taos, New Mexico.

In February 2017, Pueblo City Council voted to commit the city to 100% renewable energy ("Ready for 100%") by 2035, with the city's electric franchisee, Black Hills Energy, expected to ramp up its renewable energy portfolio from 29% to 65%. Pueblo County commissioners joined the renewable commitment in April 2018. For several years, Pueblo's Energy Future has been pushing the city to become a municipal electric provider. Among the claimed advantages for the move toward independence: lower cost to the consumer, increased reliability and the opportunity to move more aggressively toward renewable energy development. At one time, an August 2020 "divorce" seemed possible.

Top employers
According to Pueblo's 2017 Comprehensive Annual Financial Report, the top employers in the city are:

Arts and culture
Pueblo is the home to Colorado's largest single event, the Colorado State Fair, held annually in the late summer, and the largest parade, the state fair parade, as well as an annual Chile & Frijoles Festival.

Venues, museums and sites

 Pueblo Heritage Museum
 Rosemount Museum
 Sangre de Cristo Arts and Conference Center
 Buell Children's Museum
 Pueblo Convention Center
 Pueblo Memorial Hall
 City Park Carousel
 El Pueblo History Museum
 Lake Pueblo State Park
 Nature and Wildlife Discovery Center
 Pueblo Ice Arena
 Pueblo Zoo
 Steelworks Museum managed by the Steelworks Center of the West
 Union Avenue Historic Commercial District
 Weisbrod Aircraft Museum
 Pueblo City-County Library District

Sports
Pueblo is the hometown of Dutch Clark, the first man from Colorado inducted into the Pro Football Hall of Fame as well as the Colorado Sports Hall of Fame. The primary football stadium belonging to Pueblo School District 60 is named for him. Two long-standing high school rivalries are played annually at this stadium. The Bell Game has been played annually since 1892 between the Central Wildcats and the Centennial Bulldogs in what is touted as the oldest football rivalry west of the Mississippi River.

In 2008, Professional Bull Riders (PBR) moved its corporate headquarters to Pueblo. This became the site of their world headquarters based at the Historic Arkansas Riverwalk located bordering the Union Avenue Historic Commercial District.

In 2014, the Colorado State University Pueblo ThunderWolves won the NCAA Division II Football Championship, a first national title for the football program.

In 2019, the Pueblo Bulls junior ice hockey team in the United States Premier Hockey League, began play out of the Pueblo Ice Arena.

Government

Pueblo is a state-chartered municipal corporation, previously governed by its city council without the office of mayor and administered by a city manager. In 2017 voters passed Question 2A changing the city charter to a strong-mayor form of city government known as "Mayor-Council Government". Only two other cities in the state of Colorado use the strong-mayor form of government, Denver and Colorado Springs. In 2018 an election was held for mayor for the first time in over sixty years, due to none of the sixteen candidates getting more than fifty percent of the vote, a runoff was required to decide the winner. In January 2019 attorney Nicholas Gradisar faced former Pueblo City Council President Steve Nawrocki, Gradisar prevailed and was sworn in as mayor on the first of February for a term of five years, with all subsequent mayoral terms being four years and a maximum of two consecutive terms.

The deputy mayor is selected by the mayor and must be confirmed by a vote of the city council, the deputy mayor serves a term of one year. According to the city charter, the deputy mayor must be a city department head.

The city council is elected by the residents of the city. There are seven council seats, four of which are elected by district, and three elected at-large.

Pueblo is included in Colorado's 3rd Congressional District in the U.S. House of Representatives, and is currently represented by Republican Lauren Boebert. Pueblo is also included in the 3rd District of the Colorado State Senate, currently represented by Democrat Nick Hinrichsen, and District 46 of the Colorado State House, currently represented by Democrat Daneya Esgar.

Municipal law enforcement
The Pueblo Police Department is led by Chief Chris Noeller Per capita, the crime rate in Pueblo is higher than the national average for a city of the same size and does not take into account the surrounding unincorporated cumulative population of 176,529. In 2016, the FBI's Uniform Crime Report listed Pueblo's major reported crimes stats as: 1,081 violent crime, murders 9, rape 171, robbery 224, aggravated assault 677, property crimes (all) 7,473, burglary 1,797, larceny 4,505, motor vehicle theft (all) 1,171,	arson 49.

Education

Higher education

Pueblo is home to Colorado State University Pueblo (CSU Pueblo), a regional comprehensive university. It is part of the Colorado State University System (CSU System), with about 4,500 students. On May 8, 2007, CSU Pueblo received approval from the Board of Governors of the Colorado State University System to bring back football as a member of the Rocky Mountain Athletic Conference. The first game was played in the fall of 2008 at the ThunderBowl, a stadium at CSU Pueblo for over 12,000 spectators. In 2014, the football team won the NCAA Division II Football Championship.

Pueblo Community College (PCC) is a two-year, public, comprehensive community college, one of thirteen community colleges within the Colorado Community College System (CCCS). It operates three campuses serving a widely dispersed eight-county region in Southern Colorado. The main campus is located in Pueblo and serves Pueblo County. PCC is a Hispanic Serving Institution as designated by the Federal Government. Approximately 5,000 students attend PCC per semester.

Primary and secondary education
Almost all of the city limits is within Pueblo School District 60. Very small portions lie within Pueblo County School District 70.

Centennial High School was founded north of downtown on Eleventh Street in 1876, the year Colorado entered the Union. Centennial was rebuilt on a new site to the northwest in 1973. Central High School was founded in Bessemer in 1882. Central's present campus on East Orman Avenue was built in 1906 and expanded in the early 1970s. Its original building still stands four blocks away on East Pitkin Avenue. South High School and East High School were built in the late 1950s to accommodate the Baby Boomer generation. Pueblo County High School, east of the city in Vineland, serves rural residents. Rye High School is in a foothills town southwest of Pueblo. Pueblo West High School is located in the northwestern suburb of Pueblo West.

Pueblo Catholic High School closed in 1971. Its building became Roncalli Middle School in the early 1970s. By 1975 all Catholic schools in Pueblo (under the Roman Catholic Diocese of Pueblo) had closed.  there are two Catholic grade schools in Pueblo: St. John Neumann Catholic School and St. Therese Catholic School.

Dolores Huerta Preparatory High School was founded in 2004, and relocated to its current building in 2007. It features the only Early College Program in Pueblo recognized by the State of Colorado, where many students graduate with their associate degree from Pueblo Community College while also earning credit from Colorado State University Pueblo. Other Pueblo area high schools include Southern Colorado Early College, School of Engineering and Biomedical Science (formerly Pueblo Technical Academy), Parkhill Christian Academy and the Health Academy.

Media

Print
 Thrifty Nickel
The Pueblo Chieftain
 CSU Pueblo TODAY
 PULP News Magazine
Senior Beacon

Radio
The Pueblo radio market includes all of Pueblo County. In its Fall 2013 ranking of radio markets by population, Arbitron ranked the Pueblo market 238th in the United States. Six AM and 15 FM radio stations broadcast from or are licensed to the city.

Due to Pueblo's proximity to Colorado Springs, local listeners can also receive the signal of most radio stations broadcasting from the Colorado Springs radio market.

Television
The Colorado Springs–Pueblo market is the 90th largest television market in the United States.

Transportation

Local and regional buses
The City of Pueblo operates Pueblo Transit. Greyhound Lines provides bus service towards Denver, Colorado; Amarillo, Texas; Albuquerque, New Mexico. Regional bus service to La Junta, Lamar as well as Colorado Springs is provided by the CDOT operated Bustang.

Rail
Freight rail service is provided by BNSF and Union Pacific. Pueblo and its Union Depot last saw passenger train service in 1971. 

In 2016, Amtrak looked at rerouting the Southwest Chief to serve Pueblo directly. It estimated the new stop would increase annual ridership by 14,000 and ticket revenue by $1.45 million.

Pueblo has been proposed as the southern terminus for Front Range Passenger Rail, which would provide service to Colorado Springs, Denver, Boulder, Fort Collins, and Cheyenne.

Aviation
 Pueblo Memorial Airport - The local airport lies to the east of the city. Throughout the year, aircraft spotters can see large C-130, C-17, and E-3 performing landings and takeoffs. Modern fighters such as the F-22, F-15, F-35, and F-16 are also seen on occasion flying around the facility and parked on the ramp. SkyWest Airlines under the flag of United Express services the airport with non-stop daily flights to Denver International Airport, utilizing Bombardier's CRJ-200 aircraft. The airport is also home to the Pueblo Weisbrod Aircraft Museum (named for Fred Weisbrod, late city manager), reflecting the airport's beginnings as an Army Air Corps base in 1943.
 Pueblo Historical Aircraft Society

Major highways
Interstate 25 and US Route 85 run in tandem on the same north–south expressway through Pueblo. 
US Route 50 runs east–west through Pueblo.

Notable people

Politics
 Alva Adams, the fifth, tenth, and fourteenth Governor of Colorado, from 1887 to 1889, 1897 to 1899, and briefly in 1905
 Alva Blanchard Adams,  United States Senator from Colorado, 1923–1925 and 1933–1941. Son of Alva Adams
 Gordon L. Allott, United States Senator from Colorado, 1955–1973. Lieutenant Governor of Colorado, 1950-1955
 Thomas M. Bowen, United States Senator from Colorado, 1883–1889, Governor of Idaho Territory, 1871, Arkansas Supreme Court Justice, 1867–1871
 David Courtney Coates, Lieutenant Governor of Colorado, founding member of the Industrial Workers of the World
 Frank Evans, U.S. Representative from Colorado, 1965–1979
 Thomas T. Farley, Colorado state legislator and lawyer
 Joseph A. Garcia, 48th Lieutenant Governor of Colorado, 2011–2016, former President of Colorado State University Pueblo.
 Simon Guggenheim, U.S. Senator from Colorado, 1907–1913, businessman and son of Benjamin Guggenheim
 Asma Gull Hasan, political pundit
 Walter Walford Johnson, 32nd Governor of Colorado, 1950–1951
 Raymond P. Kogovsek, U.S. Representative from Colorado, 1979–1985
 Joyce Lawrence, former city councilor and Colorado state legislator
 John Andrew Martin, U.S. Representative from Colorado, 1909–1913, 1933–1939
 Bat Masterson, iconic figure of American West, sheriff of South Pueblo
 Rita Martinez, activist against Columbus Day
 James Bradley Orman, twelfth Governor of Colorado, in office 1901–1903
 Jim Parco, former United States Air Force lieutenant colonel. Leading critic in religious intolerance crisis at the United States Air Force Academy
 Dana Perino, White House Press Secretary in 2007–2009, graduated from Colorado State University Pueblo in 1994
 Frederick Walker Pitkin, second Governor of Colorado from 1879 to 1883
 John E. Rickards, first Lieutenant Governor of Montana and second Governor of Montana
 Fitch Robertson, Mayor of Berkeley, California from 1943 to 1947
 Ray Herbert Talbot, 26th Lieutenant Governor of Colorado, from 1932 to 1937. 27th Governor of Colorado, 1937
 Hubert Work, 47th United States Postmaster General, 1922 to 1923. Later the 29th United States Secretary of the Interior, 1923 to 1928

Military
 William J. Crawford, Medal of Honor recipient for his service in World War II
 Warren C. Dockum, Medal of Honor recipient for service in the American Civil War.  Buried in Pueblo 
 Drew Dennis Dix, Medal of Honor recipient for service in the Vietnam War
 Raymond G. Murphy, Medal of Honor recipient for service in the Korean War
 Carl L. Sitter, Medal of Honor recipient for service in the Korean War
 Robert M. Stillman, U.S. Air Force general
 Cathay Williams, first African-American woman to enlist in the United States Army, and the only person documented to have served while posing as a man

Business
 Ed Beauvais, airline executive
 Jim Bishop, creator of Bishop Castle
 Nona L. Brooks, leader in the New Thought movement and a founder of the Church of Divine Science
 Dan DeRose, businessman and college football player
 Charles Goodnight, legendary Texas cattleman, lived in Pueblo in the 1870s
 Benjamin Guggenheim, businessman who lived in Pueblo from 1888 to 1894, perished aboard the Titanic in 1912
 David Packard, co-founder of Hewlett-Packard computers, considered the "Father of Silicon Valley", Graduated from Pueblo Centennial High School
 William Jackson Palmer, founder of Colorado Fuel and Iron and the Denver and Rio Grande Railroad

Arts
 Kent Haruf, novelist, born in Pueblo
 Dustin Hodge, television writer and producer, lives in Pueblo
 Bat Masterson, newspaperman, former sheriff of South Pueblo
 John Meston, co-creator and script writer of CBS Western television series Gunsmoke
 E. J. Peaker, actress, star of Hello Dolly, graduated from Centennial High School in 1958
 Blaine L. Reininger, singer and musician of proto-punk and new wave, co-founder of Tuxedomoon
 Kelly Reno, child actor in the 1979  film The Black Stallion and its sequel
 Charles Rocket, Saturday Night Live cast member, formerly a news anchor in Pueblo
 Dan Rowan, star of Rowan & Martin's Laugh-In, lived in McClelland Orphanage in Pueblo and graduated from Pueblo Central High School
 Damon Runyon, newspaperman and playwright; author of Guys and Dolls. Mentioned Pueblo in many of his newspaper columns
 Connie Sawyer, actress
 Rose Siggins, actress
 Lise Simms, actress, singer, designer and dancer
 Margaret Tracey, ballet dancer and educator
 Wanda Tuchock, writer, producer, film pioneer
Mildred Cozzens Turner, composer
 Michael K. White, writer
 Grant Withers, Hollywood actor from the silent film era to the 1950s
 Ledger Wood, philosopher

Sports
 Dax Charles, Division II National Wrestling Champion competing for University of Southern Colorado now known as CSU Pueblo, CSU Pueblo wrestling coach
 Earl "Dutch" Clark, professional football player 1934–1938, charter member of Pro Football Hall of Fame, graduated from Pueblo Central High School
 John Davis, Major League Baseball pitcher (1987–1990)
 Tony Falkenstein, pro football fullback and quarterback
 Dave Feamster, ice hockey player who played for the Chicago Blackhawks and businessman
 John Gill, climber, father of modern bouldering; taught at University of Southern Colorado (CSU Pueblo)
 Kimberly Kim, professional golfer, youngest player to win the U.S. Women's Amateur
 Gary Knafelc, professional football player (1954–1963)
 Turk Lown, Major League Baseball pitcher (1951–1962)
 Bob McGraw, Major League Baseball pitcher (1917–1929), buried in Pueblo
 Tony Mendes, PBR bull rider
 Joe Pannunzio, college football administrator, player and coach.
 Frank Papish, Major League Baseball pitcher (1945 to 1950); deputy sheriff after his baseball career
 Ken Ramos, Major League Baseball outfielder
 Marty Servo, boxing Welterweight Champion of the World, retired to Pueblo
 Kory Sperry, NFL tight end; attended Pueblo County High School
 Cedric Tillman, professional football player
 George Zaharias, professional wrestler, husband of Babe Didrikson

Infamous figures
 Joseph Arridy, mentally disabled man wrongfully convicted of murder and rape; put to death in the 1930s; pardoned in 2010 as the first and only posthumous gubernatorial pardon in the state of Colorado.
 Frank DeSimone, boss of the Los Angeles crime family, born in Pueblo
 Edmund Kemper, serial killer who called police from a phone booth in Pueblo and turned himself in on April 25, 1973, after fleeing from California

Activists and organizers
 Las Madres de la Casa Verde
 Deborah Mora Espinosa and Juan Espinosa
 Rita Martinez
 Charlene Garcia Simms, Genealogy and Special Collections librarian in Pueblo
 Velma Romero Roybal, director of Grupo Folklórico del Pueblo
 Louis "Lugs" Garcia and Delfina Trujillo Garcia
 Carmen Roybal Arteaga, teacher and founder of the Chicana women's group, OmeXicana and a member of the Chicano Educators
 Ann Dominguez
 Judy Baca 
 Carla Barela
 Martín Serna, Chicano activist

Other
 John Brown, Mountain man, fur trapper, trader, resident of Pueblo in the 1840s. 
 Mary Babnik Brown, donated her hair during World War II for the manufacture of hygrometers (hair falsely reported to have been used to make Norden bombsights)
 Rick Edgeman, American statistician and sustainability researcher, born 1954 in Pueblo, Colorado.
 Teresita Sandoval, one of the first women to live in Pueblo. She and her daughters married Anglo mountain men. 
 Virginia Tighe, housewife purported to have lived as an Irishwoman named Bridey Murphy in a previous life

Sister cities 
Pueblo’s sister cities are:

In popular culture
 Pueblo as a frontier town is the setting for Louis L'Amour's 1981 Western novel Milo Talon.
 Many of the scenes in Terrence Malick's 1973 opus Badlands were filmed in and around Pueblo. The film was subsequently selected for preservation by the Library of Congress as being "culturally, historically, or aesthetically significant".
 Pueblo and its Central High School is mentioned in Thomas Pynchon's 2006 historical novel Against the Day.
 Food Wars, a series on cable television's Travel Channel, came to Pueblo to stage a contest between the Sunset Inn's and Gray's Coors Tavern's versions of the slopper. The episode first aired in August 2010.
 Pueblo is portrayed as the city where MacGruber is laid to rest in 2000 in the 2010 film that bears his name.
 The 1959 novel The Caretakers by author Dariel Telfer, along with its 1963 film adaptation, is based upon the author's experiences as an employee at the Colorado State Hospital in Pueblo.  
 In the South Park episode "The Losing Edge", Pueblo is one of the towns with which the South Park team competes.
 Many of the Colorado and Kansas scenes of the 1983 film National Lampoon's Vacation were filmed in and around Pueblo. Highway 50 East of Pueblo is the site of Cousin Eddie's house and the hotel in "Creede" Colorado is actually near St. Mary Corwin Hospital.
 The 1980s film Curse of the Blue Lights was set in Pueblo and was filmed on location.
 Little Britches Rodeo, a series on RFD-TV was filmed in Pueblo for the first 4 seasons.
 During the 1970s and 1980s, the Government Printing Office ran numerous commercials on television asking people to write to Pueblo, Colorado, for their consumer information catalogs.

See also

Colorado
Bibliography of Colorado
Index of Colorado-related articles
Outline of Colorado
List of places in Colorado
List of counties in Colorado
List of municipalities in Colorado
List of statistical areas in Colorado
Front Range Urban Corridor
South Central Colorado Urban Area
Pueblo-Cañon City, CO Combined Statistical Area
Pueblo, CO Metropolitan Statistical Area
USS Pueblo, 3 ships

Notes

References

Further reading 

 
Bibliography

External links

 City of Pueblo website
 
 CDOT map of the City of Pueblo
 Pueblo Chamber of Commerce
 
 

 
1886 establishments in Colorado
Cities in Pueblo County, Colorado
Kansas populated places on the Arkansas River
Cities in Colorado
County seats in Colorado
Forts in Colorado
Populated places established in 1886